Richard Lee Byers is an author of fantasy novels.

Biography
Richard Lee Byers holds a master's degree in Psychology. A resident of the Tampa Bay area, he worked in an emergency psychiatric facility for over a decade, then left the mental health field to become a writer. He has taught fiction writing at Hillsborough Community College. He is also a fencing and poker enthusiast.  He is the author of over forty fantasy and horror novels, including many set in the Forgotten Realms universe. His recent projects include the eBook superhero series The Impostor.

Byers has also written for League Entertainment's comic book series Simon Vector, with illustrator Johnny Atomic.

Bibliography
 The Vampire's Apprentice (January 1992)
 Forbidden (February 2003)

Forgotten Realms
 The Halls of Stormweather (July 2000)
 The Shattered Mask (June 2001)
 Dissolution (July 2002)
 The Black Bouquet (September 2003)
 The Year of Rogue Dragons trilogy
 The Rage (April 2004)
 The Rite (January 2005)
 The Ruin (May 2006)
 Queen of the Depths (August 2005)
 The Haunted Lands trilogy
 Unclean (April 2007)
 Undead (March 2008)
 Unholy (early 2009)
 Brotherhood of the Griffon
 The Captive Flame (April, 2010)
 Whisper of Venom (November, 2010)
 The Spectral Blaze (June, 2011)
 The Masked Witches (February, 2012)
 Prophet of the Dead (February, 2013)
The Sundering
The Reaver (2013)

References

External links
 

1950 births
20th-century American male writers
20th-century American novelists
21st-century American male writers
21st-century American novelists
American fantasy writers
American male novelists
Living people
Novelists from Florida
Place of birth missing (living people)